The Sadang  is a river of Sulawesi in South Sulawesi province, Indonesia. It is one of the major rivers which flow into the Strait of Macassar.

Geography
The river flows in the southwest area of Sulawesi with predominantly tropical rainforest climate (designated as Af in the Köppen-Geiger climate classification). The annual average temperature in the area is 24 °C. The warmest month is October, when the average temperature is around 26 °C, and the coldest is June, at 22 °C. The average annual rainfall is 2500 mm. The wettest month is May, with an average of 387 mm rainfall, and the driest is September, with 68 mm rainfall.

See also
List of rivers of Sulawesi
List of rivers of Indonesia

References

Rivers of South Sulawesi
Rivers of Indonesia